Marupadiyum Oru Kadhal  is a 2012 Indian Tamil-language romance film, written and directed by Vasu Baskar, starring Anirudh, Joshna Fernando, Suman and Vadivelu. It was released on 15 June and received negative reviews.

Cast

 Annirudh as Jeeva
 Joshna Fernando as Mahi
 Suman as Mahi's dad
 Vadivelu as Dr. Singaram, MBBS
 Y. Gee. Mahendra as Jeeva's father
 Ponvannan
 Vani Kishore
 Sriranjini as Jeeva's mother
 Bharani
 Thyagu
 Boys Rajan
 Vengal Rao as Stomach pain patient
 Pandu
 Thalapathi Dinesh
 Suruli Manohar
 Sanjana Singh (Item number)

Soundtrack
The music was composed by Srikanth Deva and released by Saga Music.

Release 
The Times of India gave the film one-and-a-half out of five stars and wrote that "Coming back to the film, it is an amateurish attempt with poor detailing".

References

2012 romance films
2012 films
2010s Tamil-language films
Films scored by Srikanth Deva
Indian romance films